476 may refer to:

 Interstate 476, an Interstate highway in Pennsylvania.
 The year 476 on the Gregorian calendar.
Public Law 476, an act of 79th United States Congress chartering the Civil Air Patrol.